Bowring Park is a small suburb of Liverpool in the borough of Knowsley, Merseyside, England.

It lies between the Childwall and Roby districts and is adjacent to the M62 motorway.

Court Hey Park (home of the National Wildflower Centre between 2001 and 2017) is in the Bowring Park area. Bowring Park Golf Course is split in two by the motorway.

External links 

 Liverpool Street Gallery – Liverpool 16

Towns and villages in the Metropolitan Borough of Knowsley